Keet-McElhany House is a historic home located at Springfield, Greene County, Missouri. It was built in 1881, and enlarged in 1886, and remodeled in 1900.  It is a two-story, brick dwelling with a frame attic and reflects Italianate and Queen Anne style design elements.  It features a multi-hipped and gable roof, porch with a projecting gable, and round corner tower.

It was listed on the National Register of Historic Places in 1984.

References

Houses on the National Register of Historic Places in Missouri
Italianate architecture in Missouri
Queen Anne architecture in Missouri
Houses completed in 1881
Buildings and structures in Springfield, Missouri
National Register of Historic Places in Greene County, Missouri